William Frame was a Scottish footballer who played as a left back, although he could also play at left half. He spent six years with Clyde and six with Motherwell (being heavily involved during a period in the late 1920s where the Steelmen consistently finished near the top of the Scottish Football League table, being runners-up in the 1926–27 and 1929–30 seasons), before falling out of favour and serving a loan at second-tier Dunfermline Athletic. He then played in England's Football League for one year with Gateshead in 1931–32, followed by two seasons at Bray Unknowns in the Republic of Ireland and four seasons with Linfield in Northern Ireland, returning to Motherwell for a short spell in 1938. He did not score any goals in over 440 appearances in Scotland's leagues or the Scottish Cup.

During his time at Clyde, Frame played in the Glasgow FA's annual challenge match against Sheffield in four consecutive years, and he was a guest member of a squad organised by Third Lanark that toured South America in the summer of 1923.

References

Year of birth uncertain
1890s births
Year of death missing
Place of death missing
20th-century deaths
Sportspeople from Larkhall
Footballers from South Lanarkshire
Scottish footballers
Motherwell F.C. players
Clyde F.C. players
Larkhall Thistle F.C. players
Gateshead F.C. players
Bray Unknowns F.C. players
Linfield F.C. players
Scottish Junior Football Association players
Scottish Football League players
English Football League players
NIFL Premiership players
Association football defenders
Association football wing halves
League of Ireland players
Scottish expatriate sportspeople in Ireland
Expatriate association footballers in the Republic of Ireland
Scottish expatriate footballers
Third Lanark A.C. players